Guy Richie Armitage (born 29 November 1991) is a dual code English rugby footballer who plays rugby league for Toulouse Olympique in the Betfred Super League. He previously played for the London Broncos.

Background
Armitage was born in Westminster, London, England.

Rugby union
Armitage played at Brixham and earned a scholarship to Wellington College before joining the London Irish Academy. He made his debut against Sale Sharks on 5 November 2010 becoming the third Armitage brother to play for the club after Delon and Steffon. He then spent time on loan at Championship sides London Welsh and London Scottish during the 2010–11 and 2011–12 seasons, making a total of six appearances and scoring one try.

He also made eight appearances for Welsh during 2011–12 but decided to join French side Toulon at the end of the season. Less than six months after leaving, he returned to London Irish on loan for the rest of the season having not made any appearances in France. He played 21 times upon his return and in February 2013 re-signed with the club until 2015. Before returning to London Welsh in 2015. It was announced on 15 March 2016 that Armitage will join Premiership side Wasps next season.

Rugby league

London Broncos
Armitage signed with the London Broncos in August 2019 following a successful trial with the club. He made his Super League debut in round 26 of the 2019 Super League season vs Catalans Dragons. In September 2020 it was announced that Armitage had signed for new Canadian club Ottawa Aces for their inaugural season in the RFL pyramid in 2021.

Toulouse Olympique
On 9 Mar 2021 it was reported that he had signed for Toulouse Olympique in the RFL Championship on loan. After a three week trial he was signed on for the 2021 season. He made a try scoring debut against Sheffield Eagles on 27 June and scored two tries on his only other appearance of the season at Bradford. On 21 October 2021 Toulouse announced that Armitage had signed a new one year contract and would be part of the squad for 2022, their first season in Super League.

International career
Armitage has represented England Rugby Union at every age group and made four appearances for the under-20s in 2011.

References

External links 
London Broncos profile
Guy Armitage profile at London Irish
SL profile

1991 births
Living people
Doncaster R.L.F.C. players
English sportspeople of Trinidad and Tobago descent
English rugby league players
English rugby union players
London Broncos players
London Irish players
London Scottish F.C. players
London Skolars players
London Welsh RFC players
People educated at Wellington College, Berkshire
People from Westminster
RC Toulonnais players
Rugby league players from London
Rugby union centres
Rugby union players from Westminster
Toulouse Olympique players
Wasps RFC players